The 2015 municipal amalgamations in Manitoba was the result of new legislation (Municipal Amalgamations Act) in the province that required a minimum population threshold of 1,000 people in order to incorporate a municipality.

To meet this new threshold, Manitoba's smaller municipalities—those with a population of less than 1,000—merged with one or more neighbouring municipalities by 2015.

Background 
In 1997, the Government of Manitoba established a minimum population threshold of 1,000 in order to incorporate a municipality.

As of the 2011 census, 93 of the 197 municipalities in Manitoba had populations less than 1,000. In 2012, the Manitoba government announced that municipalities would be required to amalgamate in order for them to meet the minimum population threshold and make them more sustainable communities moving forward. 

Soon after, The Municipal Amalgamations Act was enacted in 2013, requiring that municipalities with a population less than 1,000 amalgamate with one or more neighbouring municipalities by 2015. The provincial government justified such by arguing that amalgamation would be more efficient and would increase capacity for economic development, thereby strengthening Manitoba's rural communities.

Between 2013 and 2014, regulations under the Act would amalgamate 107 municipalities (65 rural municipalities, 25 towns, and 17 villages) into 47, effective 1 January 2015. These amalgamations therefore reduced the total number of municipalities in the province from 197 to 137. Despite having populations less than 1,000, two municipalities—the Rural Municipality of Victoria Beach and the Village of Dunnattor—were exempted from the requirement to amalgamate due to their uniqueness as resort municipalities. The provincial government also allowed some new amalgamated municipalities to form with a combined population under 1,000.

Criticism 
Bill 33 (the Amalgamations Act) received considerable pushback, primarily by the Association of Manitoba Municipalities (AMM).

Among others, concerns regarding amalgamation included the deadline of 1 January 2015, which was seen as too short to complete the process; the arbitrary nature of the proposed population threshold; and questions over administrative and financial efficiency.

In court, the AMM argued that the province ought to have allowed voluntary participation in amalgamation; however, the case was overturned. Speaking before the Standing Committee on Social and Economic Development of the Legislative Assembly of Manitoba in September 2013, the AMM president, Doug Dobrowolski, made the following argument:Our members have expressed many concerns since the Province of Manitoba announced its intentions to force amalgamations. Although some members support amalgamation and some do not, it is our position that the decision to amalgamate should rest…with the municipal government and its residents. The AMM is not opposed to amalgamation. What we are opposed to is forcing our members to choose a path that may not be right for their community.

Beyond the forced aspect of this bill, our members have numerous other concerns. First, the proposed timeline of January 1st, 2015, is unreasonable. We believe successful amalgamations occur at a pace that is comfortable for all parties, including the citizens of the affected municipalities. Forcing amalgamation is undemocratic and forcing them within a tight time period causes additional unnecessary stress on everyone involved. The bill does allow the minister to extend the timeline for amalgamation to a date no later than January 1st, 2019, as long as the amalgamation plan has been submitted by the deadline specified. However, we believe there is little potential for flexibility in this bill; it is completely at the discretion of the minister. 

Furthermore, we believe that the use of 1,000-citizen threshold to determine who must amalgamate is not only an artificial number, but an inaccurate one. We are aware of the many municipalities currently under this population that function at a very high level. We're also very concerned with the proposed elimination of the public input through the Municipal Board. Although the bill states that amalgamating municipalities must provide a reasonable opportunity for members of the public to comment, there is no requirement to involve the Municipal Board. The bill does not mention what would happen if members of the public are opposed to amalgamation.

Finally, although Bill 33 includes provisions to initially keep all policing arrangements the same despite any amalgamations, the AMM has concerns about how it will work in practice. Where one amalgamating municipality has its own police force or is policed by the RCMP, a new arrangement will have to be made within three years. If a new arrangement is not made after the three years to have one police service for the amalgamated municipality, the minister will enter into an agreement with the RCMP to provide policing for that municipality.…While the municipalities are now larger as result of amalgamation, governing bodies are still challenged in curtailing population decline, and encourage growth.

List of amalgamations

See also 

Manitoba
List of municipalities in Manitoba
List of rural municipalities in Manitoba
Amalgamation of Winnipeg
Association of Manitoba Municipalities
Secession from Winnipeg by the RM of Headingley

Elsewhere in Canada
2000–06 municipal reorganization in Quebec
2002–2006 municipal reorganization of Montreal
2023 New Brunswick local governance reform
Amalgamation of the Halifax Regional Municipality
Amalgamation of Toronto
Edmonton annexations

References

Further reading 

 Ashton, William, Wayne Kelly, and Ray Bollman. 2015. "Municipalities amalgamate in Manitoba: Moving towards rural regions." Manitoba Law Journal 38(2):123–51.
 Macaulay, Andrew, Andrei Friesen, and Sheri Grift. 2016. "Collaborative Planning in Action," Case-in-Point. Faculty of Architecture, University of Manitoba.
 Lambert, Steve. 2013 December 11. "Manitoba Sued By Municipalities over Forced Amalgamation." Globe and Mail.
 Miljan, Lydia, and Zachary Spicer. 2015 July. "De-amalgamation in Canada." Fraser Institute.

External links 
Manitoba’s Municipal History: Municipal Amalgamations (2015)
Manitoba’s Municipal History: Manitoba Communities

 
Mergers of administrative divisions in Canada